Duncan McMillan (18 January 1922 – 20 May 1992) was a Scottish professional footballer who played as a defender.

References

External links

1922 births
1992 deaths
Footballers from Glasgow
Scottish footballers
Association football central defenders
Maryhill Harp F.C. players
Celtic F.C. players
Grimsby Town F.C. players
English Football League players
Dundee United F.C. players
Scottish Football League players
Scottish Junior Football Association players